Jonathan Edwards (1817–1891) was the first president of Washington & Jefferson College following the union of Washington College and Jefferson College.

Biography
Edwards was born in Cincinnati, Ohio on July 19, 1817. He graduated from Hanover College in 1835 and from Hanover's theological department in 1838. Edwards taught in Kentucky from 1838 to 1842 before becoming ordained clergy in the Presbyterian Church in 1844. He served as pastor at various churches in Ohio, Maryland, Indiana, Illinois, Kentucky, New Jersey and Pennsylvania. Edwards served as the fifth president of Hanover College from 1855 through 1857.

On April 4, 1866, Edwards was elected as the first president of the newly unified Washington & Jefferson College. By the end of his presidency, the college was considering consolidating the two campuses, a direction Edwards supported. Edwards resigned the presidency of W&J on April 20, 1869 to accept a pastoral charge in Baltimore. He died in Peoria, Illinois on July 13, 1891.

References

1817 births
1891 deaths
Educators from Cincinnati
Hanover College alumni
Presidents of Washington & Jefferson College
19th-century Presbyterian ministers
American Presbyterian ministers
19th-century American educators
19th-century American clergy